Colonel Robert Ward Tate  (24 July 1864 – 28 December 1938) was the First Civil Administrator of Samoa (then Western Samoa) from 28 January 1919 to 16 March 1923, succeeding Robert Logan.

He was a lawyer and magistrate in New Zealand, and a prominent freemason.

He was a Colonel in the New Zealand Army, in the Volunteer and Territorial services and in charge of the Wellington Military District and Adjutant-General in World War I, No 82004. He has two files available online from Archives New Zealand. He found it difficult to explain the meaning of his "traditional" army rank. He was appointed a Commander of the Order of the British Empire in the 1918 New Year Honours, and a Companion of the Order of St Michael and St George in the 1923 New Year Honours.

Tate was educated at Timaru Boys' High School and after studying law was admitted to the bar in 1886, and started a practice in Greytown. He was appointed Stipendary Magistrate in Whangarei after his return from Samoa, then to New Plymouth.

He died aged 74 in Greytown Hospital where he retired to in 1933, resuming his former legal partnership with Mr J. F. Thomson. He was survived by his second wife, two sons and two daughters.

References  

 
 
 

1864 births
1938 deaths
People educated at Timaru Boys' High School
19th-century New Zealand lawyers
20th-century New Zealand judges
New Zealand military personnel of World War I
New Zealand Army officers
New Zealand Freemasons
1910s in Samoa
1920s in Western Samoa Trust Territory
New Zealand Companions of the Order of St Michael and St George
New Zealand Commanders of the Order of the British Empire